The Comins' reagent is a triflyl-donating reagent that is used to synthesize vinyl triflates from the corresponding ketone enolates or dienolates.  

It was first reported in 1992 by Daniel Comins.  The vinyl triflates prepared are useful as substrates in the Suzuki reaction.

See also
 Bis(trifluoromethanesulfonyl)aniline

References

Reagents for organic chemistry
Chloropyridines
Sulfonamides
Trifluoromethyl compounds
Substances discovered in the 1990s